Perizoma custodiata is a species of geometrid moth in the family Geometridae. It is found in North America.

The MONA or Hodges number for Perizoma custodiata is 7328.

References

Further reading

External links

 

Perizoma
Articles created by Qbugbot
Moths described in 1858